Shai Biruk (born June 15, 1984) is an Ethiopian-born Israeli footballer.  He moved to Israel at the age of six with his family. While playing for the Israeli youth academy, Beitar Nes Tubruk, his footballing talent was noticed by scouts from the Dutch football club Ajax.

Career
Biruk accepted an offer to join the youth system in Amsterdam only to come back to Israel six months later citing homesickness. During his time at Ajax, he met a fellow Jewish Israeli footballer named Daniël de Ridder and was the first to report on Ajax having a Jewish Israeli on their books to the Israel Football Association.

He was the subject of a short tug of war between Tottenham Hotspur, Ajax Amsterdam and Maccabi Haifa FC. He decided to commit to Haifa and joined their youth team before making a call up to the full side about two seasons later. After three years in the full side, his contract was not renewed so he left on a free transfer. On August 21, 2006, he agreed to a one-year deal with Maccabi Netanya.

In the start of 2008 he moved to Hapoel Be'er Sheva.
In July 2008 Biruk moved to Hapoel Bnei Lod where he last played football professionally, though he has never announced retirement.

As of June 2, 2010 Biruk is on trial with FC Thun. After a trial that lasted 4 months he is due to sign a contract with the club in January 2011, but in the end he signed for Hapoel Ashkelon.

Honours
Israeli Premier League:
Winner (3): 2003–04, 2004-05, 2005-06
Runner-up (1): 2006-07

References

External links 
 

1984 births
Living people
Ethiopian Jews
Ethiopian emigrants to Israel
Citizens of Israel through Law of Return
Israeli footballers
Association football midfielders
Beitar Nes Tubruk F.C. players
Maccabi Haifa F.C. players
Maccabi Netanya F.C. players
Hapoel Be'er Sheva F.C. players
Hapoel Bnei Lod F.C. players
Hapoel Ashkelon F.C. players
Hapoel Kfar Saba F.C. players
Israeli Premier League players
Israeli expatriate footballers
Israeli expatriate sportspeople in the Netherlands
Expatriate footballers in the Netherlands
Jewish Israeli sportspeople
Jewish footballers
Israeli people of Ethiopian-Jewish descent
Sportspeople of Ethiopian descent